Jeff Shannon (1961 – December 20, 2013) was an American film critic, born and based in Seattle. He was best known for his work with the Seattle Post-Intelligencer (1985–92) and The Seattle Times (1992–2013).

Shannon studied film history, theory and criticism at Wright State University in Dayton, Ohio. He was the assistant editor of Microsoft Cinemania CD-ROM and website movie encyclopedia (1992–98), and the original DVD section editor in the Home Video department of Amazon.com (1998–2001). He also contributed video-on-demand reviews for the late Roger Ebert’s website (2011–13)

He was injured on the island of Maui in 1979 two weeks after graduating from high school, leaving him with a C-5/6 quadriplegia. In addition to writing occasional articles for New Mobility magazine, he served two three-year terms on the Washington State Governor’s Committee on Disability Issues and Employment  (2005–11). He also wrote an column, "From Where I'm Sitting", for FacingDisability.com.

Shannon died on December 20, 2013.

References

External links
Over 300 reviews by Shannon accessible on Rotten Tomatoes

1961 births
2013 deaths
Amazon (company) people
American film critics
The Seattle Times people
Writers from Seattle
People with tetraplegia
Wright State University alumni